Dorvonjárga is a village in the municipality of Karasjok in Troms og Finnmark county, Norway.  The village is located in the eastern part of the municipality. It is also the location of an official border crossing between Dorvonjárga and Karigasniemi (Finland), over the Anarjohka river.

References

Villages in Finnmark
Karasjok
Populated places of Arctic Norway